Blainville is a provincial electoral district in the Laurentides region of Quebec, Canada that elects members to the National Assembly of Quebec. It contains the city of Blainville and two other smaller municipalities.

It was created for the 1994 election from Groulx and Terrebonne electoral districts.

In the change from the 2001 to the 2011 electoral map, it lost a part of the city of Blainville to Groulx electoral district; previously, the entire city was within Blainville electoral district.

In the change from the 2011 to 2017 electoral map, the riding lost Sainte-Anne-des-Plaines to the new riding of Les Plaines and gained the Saint-Rédempteur neighbourhood of Blainville from Groulx.

Members of the National Assembly

Election results

|-
 
|Liberal
|Jocelyne Roch
|align="right"|1,2689
|align="right"|35.47
|align="right"|-4.81

|-

|}

|-
 
|Liberal
|Pierre Saucier
|align="right"|9,719
|align="right"|28.01
|align="right"|-3.83

|-
 
|Socialist Democracy
|Denise Gagnon
|align="right"|182
|align="right"|0.52
|align="right"|-
|}

|-

|-
 
|Liberal
|Mario Massie
|align="right"|9,460
|align="right"|31.84
|-

|-

|Sovereignty
|Michel Labrèche
|align="right"|470
|align="right"|1.58
|-

|Natural Law
|Martin Howe
|align="right"|322
|align="right"|1.08
|}

References

External links
Information
 Elections Quebec

Election results
 Election results (National Assembly)

Maps
 2011 map (PDF)
 2001 map (Flash)
2001–2011 changes (Flash)
1992–2001 changes (Flash)
 Electoral map of Laurentides region
 Quebec electoral map, 2011

Quebec provincial electoral districts
Blainville, Quebec